There are in all 283 direct quotations from the Hebrew Bible (Old Testament) in the New Testament. In about 90 instances, the Septuagint is quoted literally. In around 80 further instances, the quote is altered in some way. Likewise, . The Epistle of Jude quotes the pseudepigraphal Book of Enoch (1 Enoch 1:9) and the Assumption of Moses. Other quotations are sometimes made directly from the Hebrew text (e.g. ,).

Formatting
When the New Testament was written, the Old Testament was not divided into chapters and verses, and there is therefore no uniform standard for these quotes and the authors had to provide contextual references:
  refers to 1 Kings ch. 17–19, in the words, "in Elias", i.e. in the portion of the history regarding Elias.

In popular culture 
In November 2022, the game show Jeopardy! created a controversy after bible experts disagree about which of Paul's letters had the most Old Testament quotations.

References

Bibliography 
 Gregory Beale and D. A. Carson. Commentary on the New Testament Use of the Old Testament. Grand Rapids, Mich [u.a.]: Baker Academic [u.a.], 2008. 
 Archer, Gleason Leonard, Gregory Chirichigno, and Evangelical Theological Society. Old Testament Quotations in the New Testament. Chicago: Moody Press, 1983. 
 Brooke Foss Westcott, Fenton John Anthony Hort. The New Testament in the Original Greek, 1925, pp. 601–618

External links
 Table of Old Testament quotes in the New Testament

New Testament content
Judaism in the New Testament